Pinus kesiya (Khasi pine, Benguet pine or three-needled pine) is one of the most widely distributed pines in Asia. Its range extends south and east from the Khasi Hills in the northeast Indian state of Meghalaya, to northern Thailand, Philippines, Burma, Cambodia, Laos, southernmost China, and Vietnam. It is an important plantation species elsewhere in the world, including in southern Africa and South America.

The common name "Khasi pine" is from the Khasi hills in India, and "Benguet pine" is from the landlocked province of Benguet in Luzon, Philippines, where it is the dominant species of the Luzon tropical pine forests. The Benguet pine is sometimes treated as a separate species, Pinus insularis; however, the current opinion is to treat these as conspecific with P. kesiya. The city of Baguio is nicknamed "The City of Pines", as it is noted for large stands of this tree.

Description

The bark is thick and dark brown, with deep longitudinal fissures. The branches are robust, red brown from the second year, the branchlets horizontal to drooping. The scales have transverse and longitudinal ridges across the middle of the scale surface. Pollination occurs in mid-spring, with the cones maturing 18–20 months after.

Khasi pine usually grows in pure stands or mixed with broad-leaved trees, but does not form open pine forests.

Uses
The soft and light timber of Pinus kesiya can be used for a wide range of applications, including boxes, paper pulp, and temporary electric poles. It is intensely used for timber, both sourced in natural forests and plantations.

The good-quality resin is not abundant and has not been much used except during the Spanish colonial period in the Philippines for the production of turpentine.

See also
Casuarina equisetifolia, the agoho pine

References

External links

 Gymnosperm Database: Pinus kesiya
 Suitability of Pinus kesiya for tree-ring analyses
 

Kesiya
Trees of China
Flora of Assam (region)
Flora of Bangladesh
Trees of Indo-China
Trees of the Philippines